MRSA is methicillin-resistant Staphylococcus aureus, a bacterium.

MRSA may also refer to:

 MrsA (gene), for the enzyme 2-Ketoarginine methyltransferase
 Metrolina Regional Scholars' Academy, Charlotte, North Carolina, US
 San Alberto Airport (ICAO airport code), Costa Rica
 Mat Zo (born 1990), pseudonym MRSA, British producer and DJ

See also
 Methicillin-resistant Staphylococcus epidermidis (MRSE)
 Sá, a surname